Norfolk Island has one museum, the Norfolk Island Museum set in Kingston. However, it is spread across five locations, including:
 No. 10 Quality Row - a Georgian period house
 Pier Store - museum of the Bounty Mutineers and Pitcairn Island
 Sirius Museum - maritime museum dedicated to HMS Sirius
 Commissariat Store - archaeological displays
 Norfolk Island Research Centre - archive

External links 
 official web site : http://norfolkislandmuseum.com.au/

Norfolk Island
Norfolk Island
Museums
Museums